This is a list of the preserved Pre-Columbian-era archaeological sites in Mexico City, the capital of Mexico.

This list does not include objects or constructions preserved in museums of the city.

Neither, this list does not include the Greater Mexico City pre-columbian archaeological sites outside Mexico City; only include within the 16 municipalities of Mexico City proper.

They are protected real estates that are heritage of the nation, and are declared as such in the Public Register of Monuments and Archaeological Zones of the Instituto Nacional de Antropología e Historia (INAH), in accordance with the Federal law on monuments and archaeological, artistic and historical zones of Mexico.

Buildings in the areas of the Historic center of Mexico City, Xochimilco and Central University City Campus of the UNAM are World Heritage Sites by UNESCO.

The list is ordered by their foundation or groundbreaking date.

See also
Teotihuacan, 40 kilometres (25 mi) northeast of Mexico City.

References

 
Mexico City
History of Mexico City
Aztec
Architecture in Mexico
Mexico City
 
 
Mesoamerican archaeology